The 1933–34 Hong Kong First Division League season was the 26th since its establishment.

League table

Championship playoff

References
1933–34 Hong Kong First Division table (RSSSF)
香港倒後鏡blog

Hong Kong First Division League seasons
Hong
3